Facundo Alfredo Castro  (born February 28, 1996) is an Argentinian football forward playing for Barracas Central.

Career 
Castro made his professional debut in 2014 when he was substituted for Diego Milito in a 4-0 defeat to Tigre. His second appearance came in a defeat to  Atlético de Rafaela, 2 to 0. In spite of having played in no further games in the tournament, he won the national title with La Academia. In the reserve tournament Racing were runners-up to Rosario Central and Castro scored 11 goals in 15 games.

Statistics

Honours

Titles

References 

Living people
1996 births
Argentine footballers
Argentine expatriate footballers
Association football forwards
Argentine Primera División players
Primera Nacional players
Primera B Metropolitana players
Racing Club de Avellaneda footballers
Unión de Santa Fe footballers
All Boys footballers
Barracas Central players
Cobresal footballers
Deportes Temuco footballers
Argentine expatriate sportspeople in Chile
Expatriate footballers in Chile
Sportspeople from Buenos Aires Province